Damaszka  is a village in the administrative district of Gmina Tczew, within Tczew County, Pomeranian Voivodeship, in northern Poland.

The village has a population of 277.

References

See also
History of Pomerania

Damaszka